HAT-P-19 is a K-type main-sequence star about 650 light-years away. The star is old yet metal enriched, having amount of heavy elements 250% of solar abundance. The survey in 2012 have failed to find any stellar companions to HAT-P-19.

Planetary system
In 2010 a transiting hot Saturn-sized planet was detected. Its equilibrium temperature is 984 K, and it is grey in color.

The transit-timing variation measurements in 2015 and 2018 did not detect additional planets in the system.

References

Andromeda (constellation)
K-type main-sequence stars
Planetary systems with one confirmed planet
Planetary transit variables
J07273995+2420118